The Boston Concerto is a concerto for orchestra by the American composer Elliott Carter.  The work was commissioned by the Boston Symphony Orchestra, for which the piece is titled.  It was first performed in Symphony Hall, Boston, on April 3, 2003 by the Boston Symphony Orchestra under the conductor Ingo Metzmacher.  Carter dedicated the concerto to his wife Helen Jones Carter, who died on May 17, 2003.

Composition
The Boston Concerto has a duration of roughly 19 minutes and is composed in thirteen connected movements:
Allegro staccatissimo
Lento, teneramente
Tempo primo
Meno mosso
Piu mosso, tempo primo
Meno mosso
Tempo primo
Lento, sostenuto
Tempo primo
Piu mosso
Tempo primo
Maestoso - molto espressivo
Tempo primo

Instrumentation
The work is scored for an orchestra comprising three flutes (2nd and 3rd doubling piccolo), two oboes, cor anglais, three clarinets (3rd doubling bass clarinet), three bassoons (3rd doubling contrabassoon), four horns, three trumpets, three trombones, tuba, three percussionists, harp, piano, and strings.

Reception
The Boston Concerto has been praised by music critics.  Kate Molleson of The Guardian declared it "a piece of gorgeous orchestral colour."  She added, "Sections of the ensemble glint and fade; melodic snippets gurgle to the surface and an exquisite finespun mesh holds it all together."  K. Smith of Gramophone suggested the piece confirmed a change in Carter's composition style, writing, "It might be too much of a stretch to blame this new-found clarity on the composer writing his first opera in 1999 (at the age of 90!) but clearly Carter has started letting his musical ideas sing as well as shout."

References

Concertos by Elliott Carter
2002 compositions
Concertos for orchestra
Music commissioned by the Boston Symphony Orchestra
Music dedicated to family or friends